Mosquito Lake is a lake in the U.S. state of Washington.

Mosquito Lake was named for the abundance of mosquitoes near the lake.

See also
List of lakes in Washington

References

Lakes of Whatcom County, Washington
Lakes of Washington (state)